The Sampler, Vol. 1 is a two-album package put out by producer No I.D. and producer/rapper Dug Infinite. It was released on All Natural, Inc. in 2002. On the original vinyl format, each side of both vinyls was produced either by Dug Infinite or No I.D.  Track 1-3 and 8-11 by Dug Infinite, the rest by No I.D.

Track listing
 Dr. Wax
 Copper Box
 3rd Rail
 I Used To Love Her (No I.D. Remix)
 State To State
 Specialize In Music
 Fate Or Destiny
 Exceptance
 Still Phantom's
 The Fifty Yard Line
 Wacker Drive
 Super Nova
 Thinking Cap.
 Charms Alarm

No I.D. albums
Albums produced by No I.D.
2002 compilation albums